The Tactical Intelligence Brigade is the Italian Army's Intelligence, surveillance, target acquisition, and reconnaissance (ISTAR) & Electronic Warfare (EW) unit. Founded 1 June 2004 as RISTA-EW Brigade the unit changed its name on 5 November 2018 to better reflect its mission: to collect military information on the tactical level, useful to the needs of the operational level.

History 
The brigade's origins lie with the Electronic Defense Center (Centro Difesa Elettronica - CDE) raised in 1963 in Anzio. Initially the center consisted of the IX Signal Battalion and XI Signal Battalion, to which a Signals Intelligence Unit was added in the 1960s. With the 1975 army reform the center's Signals Intelligence Unit became the 8th Signals Intelligence Battalion "Tonale" and IX Signal Battalion became the 9th Electronic Warfare Battalion "Rombo".

With the end of the Cold War the army reduced its forces in the Northeast of Italy and so on 1 January 1996 the center received the 33rd Electronic Warfare Battalion "Falzarego" in Treviso from the 5th Army Corps. On 20 January 1998 the center disbanded the 9th Electronic Warfare Battalion "Rombo", while the 33rd Electronic Warfare Battalion "Falzarego" was reorganized and elevated to 33rd Electronic Warfare Regiment on 28 October 2002.

On 19 May 1998 the center was reorganized and renamed RISTA-EW Grouping and the 8th Signals Intelligence Battalion "Tonale" was diasbanded. On 1 June 2004 the grouping was elevated to RISTA-EW Brigade, when the 41st Regiment "Cordenons" joined the grouping on that day. On 28 June 2005 the 13th Battalion "Aquileia" in Anzio was raised and joined the brigade as its Human Intelligence (HUMINT) unit. On 5 November 2018 the brigade was renamed Tactical Intelligence Brigade and on the same date the 13th Battalion "Aquileia" was reorganized and renamed 13th Regiment. In 2022 the brigade was augmented with the 28th Regiment "Pavia" and the Multinational CIMIC Group.

Current organization 
As of 2022 the brigade is organized as follows:

  Tactical Intelligence Brigade, in Anzio (Lazio)
  13th HUMINT Regiment, in Anzio (Lazio), Human Intelligence (HUMINT) unit
  28th Regiment "Pavia", in Pesaro (Marche)
  33rd EW Regiment, in Treviso (Veneto)
  41st Regiment "Cordenons", in Sora (Lazio), Surveillance and Target Acquisition unit with RQ-7C Shadow UAVs and ARTHUR counter-battery radars
  Multinational CIMIC Group, in Motta di Livenza (Veneto), multi-national NATO CIMIC unit with troops from Greece, Hungary, Italy, Portugal and Romania
 Land Integrated Analysis Unit, in Anzio
 Electronic Warfare Operational Support Unit, in Anzio
 Tactical Intelligence Training Center, in Anzio

References

External links 
 Italian Army Website: Tactical Intelligence Brigade

Italian Army Brigades
2001 establishments in Italy